Grand Island is a Norwegian band. The band was formed in Oslo in 2004, with members from Moss, Sørumsand, and Oslo. They released their first album Say No To Sin in 2006. The band themselves refer to their music as 'southern indie'. 'Say No To Sin' was well received in Norway and appeared on many lists of the best albums in 2006.

Grand Island released their second album Boys and Brutes in Spring 2008. The album was nominated for a Spellemann award for best rock-album.

Vocalist and guitarist Espen Gustavsen also plays in the band "Johnny Cane Band" with Terje Krumins of fellow Norwegian band Superfamily.

Members
Eirik Iversen - Bass
Inge Brodersen - Bass (2004–2008)
Nils Brodersen - Drums / Perc
Jon Iver Helgaker - Keys / Vocals
Espen Gustavsen- Vocals / Guitar
Pål Gustavsen - Banjo / Guitar / Vocals

Discography
Say No To Sin
This is the band's debut album, released by Grand Island in August 2006. The album contains the song "Us Annexed", which received a Spellemann Award for best music video, directed by Aksel Hennie. Grand Island recorded the album in Athletic Studios in Halden, Norway, and the album was mixed in Los Angeles by Steven McDonald and Ken Sluiter.

Boys & Brutes
This is the band's second album, released in Spring 2008.

Songs From Östra Knoll 1.22
This is the band's third album, released in 2010. The album contains the hit-single Suffer (Lid, Min Kjære) with Janove Ottesen from Kaizers Orchestra on guest vocals.

Della Loved Steve
This is the band's fourth album, released on March 15, 2013.

External links
Official Homepage
MySpace Page
Racing Junior
Video of their song "Us Annexed".

Norwegian alternative rock groups
Musical groups established in 2006
2006 establishments in Norway
Musical groups from Oslo